"Say You" is Ronnie Dove's second single for Diamond Records.

This J. B. Hicks penned track reached number 40 on the Billboard Pop Singles chart in 1964, becoming Ronnie’s first nationally charted single. Ronnie would go on to have 21 consecutive charting singles. It was included on his debut album Right Or Wrong. 
Despite its rather modest showing on the Hot 100, the song made it to #1 on Top 40 powerhouse CKLW on August 11, 1964.
It was originally recorded by singer Jamie Coe and released as a single a few years earlier. However, Jamie's version did not chart.

References

1964 singles
Ronnie Dove songs
1964 songs